Chacala is a beach-town set in small cove on the Pacific coast of Mexico in the State of Nayarit. The name means "where there are shrimp" in Náhuatl, and is part of the coastline known as the Riviera Nayarita. The population consists of approximately 300 full-time residents, but can swell to over 1000 during Mexico's most popular vacation periods such as Semana Santa, (Easter Week) and Christmas. Chacala is known for its physical beauty, unhurried lifestyle.

History

Pre-Columbian era
The region encompassing Nayarit and Jalisco was originally home to the Texcoxquin (Teqectequi) indigenous culture millennia before the European conquest. The Altavista petroglyphs, not far from Chacala, are believed to date from 2300 BCE. This extensive group of rock carvings is still used today for ceremonial religious purposes by the native Huichol.

Colonial era
The bay was first seen by Europeans when the Spaniard Francisco Cortés de Buena Ventura, a nephew of Hernán Cortés, reached here in 1524. Although Chacala was never as historically significant a port as San Blas to the north or Puerto Vallarta to the south, the sheltered bay saw a visit from explorer Sebastian Rodriguez Cermeño, sailing out of Manila, who arrived in Chacala on January 7, 1596, in a small launch after the Manila Galleon San Agustin was wrecked on the northern coast of California. The notable but idiosyncratic Jesuit missionary Father Eusebius Francesco Kühn, commonly known as 'Padre Kino', and his party departed from Chacala on his Atondo expedition in May 1683. Many members of the expedition abandoned him after he proposed that his ship be pushed across the Sonoran Desert.

Modern era
After slumbering for decades as a small fishing village and coconut plantation, Mexican doctor Laura del Valle's arrival in 1980 spurred a period of change which, in a relatively brief 15 years, transformed the town into one of Mexico's more distinctive destinations. Del Valle first built simple accommodations at Chacala's south end, where dense virgin first-growth rainforest teeming with wildlife, including ocelot, margay, and jaguarundi, grows down the flanks of a small collapsed volcano and plunges into the Pacific. She built the lodge to house visiting American medical students volunteering at the local health clinic she founded to serve the Mexican poor. Today, it has evolved into a Retreat & Wellness Center called Mar de Jade that still supports and runs a variety of non-profit projects for the local community and the neighboring impoverished farming town of Las Varas.

A Zen Buddhist with a strong commitment to helping the less-fortunate, the word of del Valle's work soon spread, and Chacala started attracting others with similar ideals, along with 'eco-tourists' looking for a tranquil, unspoiled, and little-visited beach-town 'off the beaten path'. 
Another distinctive establishment is the Hotel Majahua whose owners, Carmen and José Enrique, work to develop a socially responsible tourism industry, working with the local fishing community. Over the next decade and a half, others looking for an environ where efforts to help a local populace resulted in changes which could be seen and felt, or those just looking for an idyllic charming beach-town, found their way to Chacala. Two events in the mid '90s would change the area dramatically. Chacalilla, the small cove just north of Chacala and the surrounding land was purchased by a developer to build a gated complex with luxury homes ranging from approximately $550,000 to US$1,800,000. To provide access to the construction site and town, a paved road from Highway 200 to the beach replaced the often-flooded poor-quality circuitous dirt road which had previously kept all but the most-dedicated from visiting Chacala.

Geography

Location

Chacala is located on the south west portion the Nayarit coast, which itself is located about mid-way on the Mexican Pacific Coast. Nayarit encompasses , which makes it a little larger than the state of Maryland in the U.S.A. It has  of Pacific coastline. Nayarit is bordered by the states of Sinaloa, Zacatecas and Durango to the north, and by Jalisco to the east and south. The coastal plain is the strip of land that runs along most of the west coast of Mexico between the Pacific Ocean and the foothills and mountains.

Climate
Chacala (and all of Nayarit) lies south of the Tropic of Cancer, thus it is located in the true tropics, and its climate is tropical – hot and humid. The actual classification is 'warm subhumid tropical'.

The rains are concentrated in periods of brief intense thunderstorms, often occurring in the afternoons, most during the summer wet season between May and October, although a lesser but significant winter wet season exists as well. The wet seasons are separated by spring and fall dry seasons. Chacala received moderate to severe damage from Hurricane Kenna in October 2002.

Flora
Nayarit's  natural floral habitat consists of tropical coastal savannah, tropical deciduous forest, tropical semi-deciduous forest and riparian wetland. The region also includes large and small tracts of cultivated land. The lush Nayarit jungle is home to over 300 species of orchids alone. The biodiverse tropical deciduous forests of Mexico, such as those of Nayarit's foothills and mountains, contain up to 40% of Mexico's flora and fauna diversity. Parts of the tropical deciduous forest on the Pacific Coast near Nayarit have been found to be among the top 10 most species-rich floral habitats on earth.

Fauna
The fertile coastal plain and lush jungle of the foothills and mountains of the Sierra Madre Occidental support a wide variety of fauna, including over 400 bird species, and a rich diversity of mammals, reptiles, amphibians, and other animal species. Some of the significant birds include the Amazon Parrot, Tropical Kingbird, Great Kiskadee, Hooded Oriole, and the Blue-footed Booby. Mammals include an incredibly wide range of 'big cats' such as Ocelot, Margay, Jaguar, Jaguarundi and Puma along with deer, wild boar, coati mundi, skunk, badger, coyote, wild rabbit, armadillo, various snakes, lizards, and frogs.

References

External links

Reynolds, Christopher, Playa Chacala: Sun, sand and something more Los Angeles Times, February 24, 2007
 Wanderer, Ande, Chillin' in Chacala  Transitions Abroad 2006

Port cities and towns on the Mexican Pacific coast
Populated places in Nayarit
Beaches of Nayarit